Marion Township is one of nine townships in Lawrence County, Indiana, United States. As of the 2010 census, its population was 9,449 and it contained 4,218 housing units.

History 
Marion Township is named for Francis Marion.

Geography 

Cities, towns, villages 
 Mitchell

Unincorporated towns 
 Hartleyville at 
 Rabbitville at 
 Redding at 
 Spring Mill Village at 
 Tarry Park at 
 Woodville at 
 Yockey at 
(This list is based on USGS data and may include former settlements.)

Cemeteries 
The township contains these thirteen cemeteries: Bass, Burton, Connelly, Crest Haven, Erwin, Freedom, Hall, Hamer, Isom, Knott, Red Cross, Sheeks and Thomason.

Major highways 
  U.S. Route 50
  State Road 37
  State Road 60

Lakes 
 Sheeks Lake

Landmarks 
 Spring Mill State Park

Education 
 Mitchell Community Schools

Marion Township residents may obtain a free library card from the Mitchell Community Public Library in Mitchell.

Political districts 
 Indiana's 9th congressional district
 State House District 62
 State House District 65
 State Senate District 44

References 
 
 United States Census Bureau 2008 TIGER/Line Shapefiles
 IndianaMap

External links 
 Indiana Township Association
 United Township Association of Indiana
 City-Data.com page for Marion Township

Townships in Lawrence County, Indiana
Townships in Indiana